The Mysterious Dr. Fu Manchu is a 1929 American pre-Code drama film directed by Rowland V. Lee and starring Warner Oland as Dr. Fu Manchu. It was the first Fu Manchu film of the talkie era. Since this was during the transition period to sound, a silent version was also released in the United States, although only the sound version exists today. The film's copyright was renewed.

Plot
A young white girl, Lia Eltham, is left in Fu Manchu's care. A British regiment, chasing Boxer rebels, fires on Fu Manchu's home, killing his wife and child. When Lia Eltham grows up, he uses her as an instrument for revenge, killing all descendants of those who killed his family. Opposing Fu Manchu are Police Inspector Nayland Smith and Dr. Jack Petrie.

Cast
 Warner Oland as Dr. Fu Manchu
 Neil Hamilton as Dr. Jack Petrie
 Jean Arthur as Lia Eltham
 O. P. Heggie as Inspector Nayland Smith
 William Austin as Sylvester Wadsworth
 Claude King as Sir John Petrie
 Charles A. Stevenson as General Petrie
 Evelyn Selbie as Fai Lu
 Noble Johnson as Li Po
 Laska Winter as Fu Mela
 Wong Chung as Chinese Official (uncredited)
 Lawford Davidson as Clarkson (uncredited)
 Chappell Dossett as Reverend Mr. Eltham (uncredited)
 Charles Giblyn as Weymouth (uncredited)
 Donald MacKenzie as Trent (uncredited)
 Tully Marshall as Chinese Ambassador (uncredited)
 Evelyn Mills as Little Girl (uncredited)
 William J. O'Brien as Servant (uncredited)
 Charles Stevens as Singh (uncredited)
 USC Trojan Marching Band as Marching Band (uncredited)

Production

The film was very loosely based on the 1913 novel The Mystery of Dr. Fu-Manchu by Sax Rohmer. The lead character of the novel, Sir Nayland Smith, is played down in this film, and the secondary hero, Dr. Petrie, becomes the main character. Warner Oland, an actor of Swedish descent, was so believable in the role of Fu Manchu that he embarked on a career of playing Asian types throughout the 1930s, portraying the famous Asian detective Charlie Chan, until his death in 1938.

Characterization
The Mysterious Dr. Fu Manchu incorporates several Yellow Peril stereotypes typical of that era in its portrayal of Fu Manchu, including his skillful use of poison, blow darts, and use of hypnosis to control a white woman throughout the film.

Sequels
Several of the actors portray the same roles in the 1930 sequel The Return of Dr. Fu Manchu, which was followed by the conclusion of the trilogy, the 1931 Daughter of the Dragon. Immediately after, MGM picked up the rights for the Fu Manchu character to produce their 1932 The Mask of Fu Manchu, a one-shot production which featured Boris Karloff in the title role.

References

External links

 
 
 
 Jean Arthur and Fu Manchu (stills)

1929 films
1929 crime drama films
1920s crime thriller films
American black-and-white films
American crime thriller films
Films based on British novels
Films directed by Rowland V. Lee
Paramount Pictures films
American crime drama films
Films with screenplays by Florence Ryerson
Films with screenplays by Joseph L. Mankiewicz
Fu Manchu films
1920s English-language films
1920s American films